David E. Fanning (born 25 May 1946) is a South African American journalist and filmmaker. He was the executive producer of the investigative documentary series Frontline since its first season in 1983 to his retirement in 2015. He has won eight Emmy Awards and in 2013 received a Lifetime Achievement  Emmy in honor of his work.

Career
He began his filmmaking career as a young journalist in South Africa. His first films, Amabandla AmaAfrika, directed alongside BBC Journalist, Francois Marais (1970) and The Church and Apartheid (1972), produced for BBC-TV, dealt with race and religion in his troubled homeland. He came to the U.S. in 1973 and began producing and directing local and national documentaries for KOCE, a public television station in California. His film 'Deep South, Deep North' (1973) was a PBS/BBC co-production and the first in a long succession of collaborations between U.S. and European television, especially the British. In 1977, Fanning came to WGBH Boston to start the international documentary series WORLD.  As executive producer, he produced and presented over 50 films for PBS in five years. With director Antony Thomas, Fanning produced and co-wrote Death of a Princess (1980). Then in 1982, again with Thomas, he produced Frank Terpil: Confessions of a Dangerous Man, which won the Emmy Award for best investigative documentary.

In 1982, Fanning began the development of Frontline. The series has worked with well over 200 producers and as many journalists, covering a wide range of domestic and foreign stories.  Its signature has been to combine good reporting with good filmmaking.

With Fanning's encouragement, one of Frontlines singular achievements has been its embrace of the Internet. In 1995, Frontline developed one of the first deep content web sites in history. By putting interviews, documents and additional editorial materials on the web, the series made its journalism transparent, and changed the nature and content of broadcast journalism. Rather than an ephemeral one-time transmission, the documentaries and all their ancillary materials are now preserved on the series website. In 2013, there are over 150 hours of full-length documentaries streamed on the series website, one of the largest sites of its kind. Fanning is quoted saying, "This is the great promise of public media. This is where we hold our work for the future, our public library, our contribution to the intellectual commons."

In 2001, Fanning's determination to bring more foreign stories to American audiences led to the creation of Frontline/World, a television magazine-style series of programs designed to encourage a new, younger generation of producers and reporters. The emphasis has been on bringing a largely unreported world to viewers through a series of journeys and encounters. Like its counterpart series, Frontline/World has made a deep commitment to its website, offering original web-exclusive video and reporting by graduate journalism students and an international network of correspondents. Fanning sees it as a prototype for the future, and a place to build a community of enterprising journalists.

In 2015,  Fanning retired as executive producer of Frontline after 33 seasons. He's now at large and the current executive producer is Raney Aronson-Rath.

Awards and honors
In 2004, Fanning received the Columbia Journalism Award, the highest honor awarded by the faculty of the Columbia University Graduate School of Journalism, recognizing "Singular journalistic performance in the public interest... David Fanning and his signature program, Frontline, have turned a commitment to probing journalism and public service into an enduring national conversation, without which far too many important issues would remain veiled or hidden altogether." In 2010, Fanning was honored by the Corporation for Public Broadcasting with the Ralph Lowell Award, public television's most prestigious award, recognizing "outstanding contributions" to the field.  That same year Fanning was also honored with the Goldsmith Career Award for Excellence in Journalism by the Shorenstein Center at the Harvard Kennedy School.

In 2013, on Frontlines 30th anniversary, Fanning received a Lifetime Achievement Emmy Award.

References

External links
David Fanning profile at emmyonline.com

1946 births
Living people
South African emigrants to the United States
White South African people
American television producers
South African television producers
PBS people
University of Cape Town alumni